The Security & Defence Agenda (SDA) was a security and defence think-tank based in Brussels. Its activities included debates, international conferences and a range of publications. In October 2014, most of the activities of the SDA were incorporated into the Friends of Europe think-tank.

The Security & Defence Agenda (SDA) provided a neutral meeting point for defence and security specialists from NATO and the EU. The SDA developed into an important forum for the discussion of defence and security policies. With the rapidly evolving nature of the security environment, the SDA champion dynamic new ways of consulting global opinion on security issues, including the world's only mass-participation online security policy event, the Security Jam, and its Cyber-Security Initiative.

The Security Jam continues to be run by Friends of Europe. This massive online brainstorm brings together several thousand participants from around the globe, and from the security sector at large – civilians and military from national governments, international organisations, NGOs, think-tanks, academia, business and the media. The Jam aims to develop innovative and concrete solutions to global security challenges.

The SDA welcomed high-ranking personalities from the world of security and defence, including US Defense Secretary Robert Gates. Recep Tayyip Erdoğan, Anders Fogh Rasmussen, Cecilia Malmström, Neelie Kroes, Pauline Neville-Jones, Alexander Vershbow, General James L. Jones, Elmar Mammadyarov and many others.

Advisory board

The SDA received guidance from its Advisory Board, led by Jaap De Hoop Scheffer and Javier Solana.

Members included:

 Gen. Stéphane Abrial
 Claude-France Arnould
 Gen. Knud Bartels
 Gilles de Kerchove
 Giampaolo Di Paola
 Ambassador Hüseyin Diriöz
 Bates Gill
 Frederick Kempe
 Brig. Gen. Ilkka Laitinen
 Janusz Onyszkiewicz
 Ioan Mircea Pascu
 Mikhail Remizov
 Walter Stevens
 Leendert van Bochoven
 Geoffrey Van Orden
 Lt. Gen. Ton van Osch
 Alexander Vershbow
 Pierre Vimont
 Veronika Wand-Danielsson

The Director of the SDA was Giles Merritt, who is also Secretary-General of the think-tank Friends of Europe and Editor of the policy journal Europe's World.

References

Think tanks based in Belgium